Gibberifera mienshana is a species of moth of the family Tortricidae. It is found in China (Shanxi) and the Russian Far East.

References

Moths described in 1971
Eucosmini